Rolf Larsen (August 26, 1934 – August 11, 2014), a Democrat originally from Allegheny County, was first elected to the Supreme Court of Pennsylvania in 1978.

Background
Born in Pittsburgh, Pennsylvania, Larsen went to Pennsylvania State University, University of Pittsburgh, Duquesne University, Santa Clara University School of Law, and then received his law degree from Penn State University, Dickinson School of Law. In 1974, he was elected judge of the Allegheny County, Pennsylvania Court of Common Pleas. Following that Larsen was elected to the Pennsylvania Supreme Court in 1977.

Impeachment and removal from office
In 1981, a public feud between Larsen and Justice Robert N. C. Nix, Jr. took on racial undertones when newspapers reported that Larsen allegedly threatened to publicize the fact that Nix was black in an attempt to defeat him for retention. Larsen was investigated and exonerated by a judicial board of inquiry, however, the disputes between the justices continued.

In 1992, Larsen was accused of improperly communicating with a trial judge about a case. Larsen in turn filed court documents accusing Nix and other Justices of the Supreme Court of similar conduct. Upon hearing those allegations, the Pennsylvania Attorney General convened a grand jury to investigate the situation.

The grand jury found no evidence of improper communications among members of the court, but did find evidence that Justice Larsen was involved in a conspiracy to fraudulently obtain prescription drugs. Larsen, who had been prescribed drugs for clinical anxiety and depression since the 1960s, arranged for his doctor to write prescriptions to court employees because he had wanted to keep his treatment a secret while holding public office. He was charged with several offenses related to this matter in October 1993.

In April 1994, a jury found Larsen guilty of two counts of criminal conspiracy. Two months later the trial court sentenced Justice Larsen to one year of probation for each count and removed him from office for the "infamous" crime of which he was convicted.

While Larsen appealed the sentencing order, the Pennsylvania General Assembly proceeded with impeachment and removal proceedings. The Pennsylvania House of Representatives impeached Larsen on seven charges, some relating to the crime and another relating to improper communication with a trial judge about a case. In October 1994, in his impeachment trial, the Pennsylvania Senate convicted Larsen of improper communication, removed him from office, and prohibited him from holding any office of public trust in the future. He is the only Pennsylvania Supreme Court justice to be removed by the Pennsylvania Senate in an impeachment process.

Effect of notoriety
Amid these troubles and feuds involving Supreme Court justices in the early 1990s, specifically including Larsen, Pennsylvania voters sought to limit the "King's Bench" power. The public image of Justice Larsen made him a poster child for the need for court reform. The upheaval surrounding Larsen's time on the bench served as a catalyst for a much-needed change in the state judicial system. Pennsylvanians for Modern Courts credits the public turmoil he caused with leading to the overwhelming passage of a constitutional amendment that strengthened the way judges are disciplined for misconduct. In 1993, Pennsylvania voters amended the State Constitution. The change created a due process system for judges through a state Judicial Conduct Board, which independently investigates misconduct complaints, and a Court of Judicial Discipline, which independently determines a Pennsylvania judge's innocence or guilt.

Death
On August 11, 2014, Larsen died of lung cancer in Pittsburgh, Pennsylvania, at the age of 79, just fifteen days shy of what would have been his 80th birthday.

Notable opinions
Pugh v. Holmes, 486 Pa. 272, 405 A.2d 897 (Pa. 1979) - abandoned the doctrine of "Caveat Emptor", and held that residential leases contain an implied warranty of habitability.

References

External links
 
 http://www.aopc.org/OpPosting/Supreme/out/Larsen-Opinion-Hudock.pdf
 http://www.zwire.com/site/news.cfm?newsid=10881019&BRD=2549&PAG=461&dept_id=514257&rfi=6

1934 births
2014 deaths
Politicians from Pittsburgh
Judges of the Pennsylvania Courts of Common Pleas
Justices of the Supreme Court of Pennsylvania
Impeached United States judges removed from office by state or territorial governments
Judges convicted of crimes
Pennsylvania State University alumni
Duquesne University alumni
University of Pittsburgh alumni
Dickinson School of Law alumni
Pennsylvania Democrats
Pennsylvania lawyers
Deaths from lung cancer in Pennsylvania
Pennsylvania politicians convicted of crimes
Lawyers from Pittsburgh
20th-century American judges
20th-century American lawyers